San Cristóbal de la Cuesta is a municipality located in the province of Salamanca, Castile and León, Spain. As of 2016 the municipality has a population of 958 inhabitants.

References

Municipalities in the Province of Salamanca